Aa paleacea is an orchid in the genus Aa. It is native to the Andes, between southern Costa Rica, Peru and Ecuador, at an altitude of 2900–4400 metres. It is the type species for the genus.

References

Reichenbach, H.G. (1854) Xenia Orchidacea 1: 18.
Hammel, B.E. & al. (2003) Manual de Plantas de Costa Rica 3: 1–884. Missouri Botanical Garden Press.
Harling, G. & Andersson, L. (2005) Orchidaceae Genera Aa-Cyrtidiorchis. Flora of Ecuador 76: 225(2), Botanical Institute, University of Göteborg, Riksmuseum, Stockholm.
Dueñas Gómez, H.del C. & Fernández-Alonso, J.L. (2007) Sinopsis de la subfamilia Spiranthoideae (Orchidaceae) en Colombia, Parte I. Revista de la Academia Colombiana de Ciencias Exactas, Físicas y Naturales 31: 1-27.

paleacea
Plants described in 1854
Taxa named by Carl Sigismund Kunth
Taxa named by Heinrich Gustav Reichenbach
Terrestrial orchids